Apstar 2 was a communications satellite based on the Hughes HS-601 spacecraft design, built by Hughes Space and Communications Company for APT Satellite Holdings, a Hong-Kong based company.  The satellite was intended to provide video, radio, data, and telephone services to about 2/3 of the world's population. It was launched on Jan. 26, 1995 by a Long March 2E launcher from Xichang Satellite Launch Center in China, but was destroyed 50 seconds after liftoff when the rocket exploded. The failed rocket also veered off course after launch and killed at least six people on the ground.

The Hughes Failure Investigation Team found that excess vibration had caused a rocket fairing to fail due to a structural deficiency.  However, the Chinese blamed the rocket-satellite interface for the failure.  The two sides agreed that the fairing and the satellite interface would both be improved.  The Long March 2E rocket would be retired at the end of 1995.

Political effects 

The Apstar 2 failure investigation caused great political controversy in the United States.  The export of satellite technology had previously been controlled by the State Department under the International Traffic in Arms Regulations, but it was being transferred to the Commerce Department under the Export Administration Regulations.  Hughes had received a license from the Commerce Department in 1993 to export the satellite temporarily to China for launch.  Hughes also gave the Commerce Department a copy of the failure investigation report and received Commerce approval to export it to China.  However, the Commerce Department had noted  that some areas still required State Department approval, and Hughes lawyers had also questioned whether they needed a State Department license.

The U.S. government launched an inquiry into the Apstar 2 and Intelsat 708 launch failure investigations.  In 1998, the U.S. Congress reclassified satellite technology as a munition and returned it to the control of the State Department under the International Traffic in Arms Regulations.  No export licenses to China have been issued since 1996, and an official at the Bureau of Industry and Security emphasized in 2016 that "no U.S.-origin content, regardless of significance, regardless of whether it’s incorporated into a foreign-made item, can go to China."  The Justice Department launched a criminal investigation in 1999 of export violations by Hughes.  In 2003, Boeing paid $32 million in fines to settle the case, having acquired Hughes in 2000.

References

External links

APSTARII

Communications satellites of China
Spacecraft launched in 1995
Satellites using the BSS-601 bus
1995 in China
Spacecraft launched by Long March rockets